Emesis is a Neotropical genus of butterflies.

Species include:
Emesis adelpha Le Cerf, 1958
Emesis aerigera (Stichel, 1910)
Emesis angularis Hewitson, 1870
Emesis ares (Edwards, 1882)
Emesis arnacis Stichel, 1928
Emesis aurimna (Boisduval, 1870)
Emesis brimo Godman & Salvin, 1889
Emesis castigata Stichel, 1910
Emesis cerea (Linnaeus, 1767)
Emesis condigna Stichel, 1925
Emesis cypria C. & R. Felder, 1861
Emesis diogenia Prittwitz, 1865
Emesis elegia Stichel, 1929
Emesis emesia (Hewitson, 1867)
Emesis eurydice Godman, 1903
Emesis fatimella Westwood, 1851
Emesis fastidiosa Ménétriés, 1855
Emesis glaucescens Talbot, 1929
Emesis guttata (Stichel, 1910)
Emesis heterochroa Hopffer, 1874
Emesis heteroclita Stichel, 1929
Emesis lacrines Hewitson, 1870
Emesis liodes Godman & Salvin, [1886]
Emesis lucinda (Cramer, [1775])
Emesis lupina Godman & Salvin, [1886]
Emesis mandana (Cramer, [1780])
Emesis neemias Hewitson, 1872
Emesis ocypore (Geyer, 1837)
Emesis orichalceus Stichel, 1916
Emesis poeas Godman, [1901]
Emesis russula Stichel, 1910
Emesis sinuata Hewitson, 1877
Emesis spreta Bates, 1868
Emesis satema (Schaus, 1902)
Emesis saturata Godman & Salvin, [1886]
Emesis tegula Godman & Salvin, [1886]
Emesis temesa (Hewitson, 1870)
Emesis tenedia C. & R. Felder, 1861
Emesis toltec Reakirt, 1866
Emesis vimena Schaus, 1928
Emesis vulpina Godman & Salvin, [1886]
Emesis xanthosa (Stichel, 1910)
Emesis zela Butler, 1870

References

Riodininae
Riodinidae of South America
Butterfly genera
Taxa named by Johan Christian Fabricius